The Best of Omen: Teeth of the Hydra is a compilation album by American heavy metal band Omen. It was originally released in 1989 by Metal Blade. The album compiles songs from all five Omen albums that had been released by 1989.

Track listing

Tracks 3, 5, 10 from Battle Cry (1984)
Tracks 2, 11 from Warning of Danger (1985)
Tracks 1, 4, 6, 8 from The Curse (1986)
Track 7 from Nightmares (1987)
Track 9 from Escape to Nowhere (1988)

Personnel
Omen
 J.D. Kimball - vocals except "Thorn in Your Flesh"
 Kenny Powell - guitars
 Steve Wittig - drums
 Jody Henry - bass
 Coburn Pharr - vocals on "Thorn in Your Flesh"

References

Omen (band) albums
1989 compilation albums
Metal Blade Records compilation albums